Babu Valley (Maltese: Wied Babu) is a small valley near Żurrieq, Malta. The valley is considered to be one of the most lushest in Malta and is a minor tourist attraction due to its vistas of the Blue Grotto. The valley is also known for its climbing and trekking sites. Certain parts of the valley were under controversy in 2019 after several reports stating that the entirety of the valley is privately owned surfaced.

References 

Żurrieq
Valleys of Malta